Luc Wulterkens (born 11 March 1990) is a Dutch football defender who last played for DSK Shivajians in the I League

Career

Fortuna Sittard
Wulterkens joined Fortuna Sittard in 2008. He started his career at the Fortuna youth system. He played for the U19s and then the Sittard U21s before joining the first team. He made his first team debut in the 0-0 draw against FC Dordrecht. Luc left Sittard to join Vinkenslag in 2009 after making four first team appearances for the club.

Vinkenslag
Luc joined Vinkenslag in 2009. He left the club to join RKSV Groene Ster in 2011.

Groene Ster
Wulterkens joined Groene Ster in 2011 and made his first team debut in the 4-2 loss at VV Staphorst. He went on to spend 4 years with the club.

EVV
Luc joined Dutch club EVV in 2014. In the year he spent with Echt, he picked up two yellow cards while he played 13 matches for the club. He played his last match for the club in a 1-0 win against HSC '21

DSK Shivajians
Wulterkens then signed for Indian I-League club DSK Shivajians F.C. in 2015 after leaving EVV.
He scored his first goal for the Shivajians in the 7-0 thrashing of Vincentian Old Boys in a friendly match.

Mallorca Body Coaching and Mindfulness
After his football career, Wulterkens started a career in mindfulness coaching.

References
 (retrieved 31 August 2009)
 (retrieved 20 May 2013)

1990 births
Living people
RKVV EVV players
Association football defenders
Dutch footballers
RKSV Groene Ster players
People from Beek
DSK Shivajians FC players
Footballers from Limburg (Netherlands)
Dutch expatriate sportspeople in India#
Dutch expatriate footballers
Expatriate footballers in India
Fortuna Sittard players
Eerste Divisie players
Derde Divisie players